Australia and New Zealand both have Anzac Day Acts providing for the commemoration of Anzac Day in those countries. In New Zealand the current act is the Anzac Day Act 1966, and in Australia, the Anzac Day Act 1995.

External links
 Anzac Day Act 1995

Observances honoring victims of war
ANZAC (Australia)